Acer calcaratum is an Asian species of maple found in Yunnan and northern Indochina (Myanmar, Thailand, Vietnam). It is very rare in China.

Acer calcaratum is a small tree up to 7 meters tall. Leaves are non-compound, the blade up to 15 cm long and 21 cm wide, with 3 deeply cut lobes but no teeth.

References

calcaratum
Flora of Yunnan
Flora of Myanmar
Flora of Thailand
Flora of Vietnam
Plants described in 1872